Ed Malone may refer to:

Ed Malone, character in King of the Lost World
Ed Malone, see Oakville municipal election, 2003
Ed Malone, fictional character, see List of Coronation Street characters
Ed Malone, fictional character in Growing Pains

See also
Edward Malone (disambiguation)
Ted Malone (disambiguation)
Edmond Malone (1741–1812), Shakespearian scholar
Edwin Malone